The 1991 Gator Bowl was an American college football bowl game between Oklahoma Sooners and the Virginia Cavaliers played on December 29, 1991, at the Gator Bowl Stadium in Jacksonville, Florida. For sponsorship reasons, the game was officially known as the Mazda Gator Bowl.

Oklahoma represented the Big Eight Conference and Virginia represented the Atlantic Coast Conference (ACC) in the competition. The game was the final competition of the 1991 football season for each team and resulted in a 48–14 Oklahoma victory, even though spread bettors favored Virginia to win by 1.5 points.

References

Gator Bowl (December)
Gator Bowl
Oklahoma Sooners football bowl games
Virginia Cavaliers football bowl games
20th century in Jacksonville, Florida
December 1991 sports events in the United States
1991 in sports in Florida